The Deutsch Schützen massacre was a 1945 mass killing of approximately 60 Jewish forced laborers in Deutsch Schützen-Eisenberg in Austria. At the old church, Martinskirche, in the farmland on the west side of Deutsch Schützen, a plaque is erected on the exterior of the building memorializing those murdered in the massacre.

Incident and aftermath
The incident occurred on 29 March 1945.

The victims' remains were found in 1995 by the Israelitische Kultusgemeinde Wien. In 2008, Viennese political science student Andreas Forster discovered the name of Adolf Storms in records of the incident. Forster's professor Walter Manoschek gathered evidence and conducted a videotaped interview with Storms. In 2009, then 90-year-old Storms was indicted for his alleged involvement in the killings.

Storms died on June 28, 2010 at the age of 90.

See also
Rechnitz

References

Further reading

External links 
 The massacre of Hungarian-Jewish forced laborers in Deutsch-Schützen (Burgenland) and its judicial prosecution by the Austrian People's Courts 
 Remembering Deutsch Schützen 

Massacres in 1945
Oberwart District
The Holocaust in Austria
Holocaust massacres and pogroms
Mass murder in 1945
Nazi war crimes
Conflicts in 1945
World War II massacres
1945 in Austria
March 1945 events in Europe